Agunaix is a monotypic moth genus in the subfamily Arctiinae. Its single species, Agunaix lacrumans, is found in Peru and Bolivia. Both the genus and species were first described by Schaus in 1898.

References

Arctiinae
Monotypic moth genera
Moths of South America